The Aaron Taft House is an historic house at 215 Hazel Street, in Uxbridge, Massachusetts.  Built about 1749, it is one of five surviving gambrel-roofed 18th-century houses in the town.  It is  stories in height, with a side-gabled gambrel roof, clapboard siding, and central chimney.  The main facade is asymmetrical, with three window bays, one to the left of the entrance, which is off center, and is adorned with sidelight windows, pilasters, and a simple entablature.  It was the birthplace in 1785 of Peter Rawson Taft I, the grandfather of President William Howard Taft,

On October 7, 1983, it was added to the National Register of Historic Places.

See also
Taft family
National Register of Historic Places listings in Uxbridge, Massachusetts

References

Houses in Uxbridge, Massachusetts
National Register of Historic Places in Uxbridge, Massachusetts
Houses on the National Register of Historic Places in Worcester County, Massachusetts